Steelman, Steel Men, or variation, may refer to:

People
 'Steel Man' Narendra Chaudhary (1968-2016) Indian bomb defusing expert
 Big Steel Man (born 1956), U.S. professional wrestler

Surname
 Alan Steelman (born 1942), Dallas businessman and former congressman
 David Steelman, Missouri politician and lawyer, husband of Sarah Steelman
 Farmer Steelman (1875–1944), American professional baseball player
 Glenn Steelman, American film and television director
 John R. Steelman (1900–1999), former White House chief of staff
 John Hansson Steelman (1655–1749), Delaware frontiersman and fur trader
 Paul Steelman (born 1955), American architect
 Sanford L. Steelman, Jr. (born 1951), North Carolina judge
 Sara Steelman (born 1946), Pennsylvania politician and biologist
 Sarah Steelman (born 1958), Missouri politician, wife of David Steelman

Fictional characters
 Steelman and Smith, characters in Henry Lawson stories

Places
 Steelman, Saskatchewan, Canada

Groups and organizations
 The Steelmen, a British band founded and fronted by Tommy Steele
 Steelman Partners, U.S. architectural firm
 Youngstown Steelmen (1910-1915), a minor league baseball team
 The Steel Men, the Swedish soccer team Sandvikens IF
 Steelmen, several soccer teams in England; see List of football clubs in England

Other uses
 Steelworker, also called steeler or steelman
 Sentinel Steelman, the Steelman locomotive model made by Sentinel Waggon Works
 Steelmanning, the opposite of a straw man argument; finding the best form of an opponent's argument
 Steelman language requirements for the programming language later named Ada

See also

 Iron Man (disambiguation)
 Man of Steel (disambiguation)
 Woman of Steel (disambiguation)
 Steel worker (disambiguation)
 Steeler (disambiguation)
 Steel (disambiguation)
 Man (disambiguation)